Gobio macrocephalus is a species of gudgeon, a small freshwater fish in the family Cyprinidae. It is found in Asia in South Korea, also in the Tumen River, China.

References
 

macrocephalus
Cyprinid fish of Asia
Fish of East Asia
Freshwater fish of China
Fish described in 1930
Taxa named by Tamezo Mori
Fish of Korea